Robin Hood may refer to:

 Robin Hood (Tippett opera), a ballad opera by Michael Tippett, composed in 1934, the score remains unpublished
 Robin Hood (De Koven opera), a comic opera by Reginald De Koven, lyrics by  Harry B. Smith and Clement Scott, composed 1888–1889
 Robin Hood, by George Alexander Macfarren, produced in 1860